Dhan Singh Rawat (born 7 October 1972) is the Cabinet Minister of Uttarakhand and a member of the Bharatiya Janata Party (BJP). He has served as a Member of the Legislative Assembly of Uttarakhand, representing the constituency of Srinagar Garhwal.

Personal life and career
Dhan Singh Rawat was born in a hamlet in Pauri Garhwal and educated at the village school. He earned master's and doctoral degrees from Hemwati Nandan Bahuguna Garhwal University in History.

A party secretary for the BJP in Uttarakhand, he failed to gain election to the state legislature in 2012 in the constituency of Srinagar Garhwal; he entered the legislature in 2017 and has since served as a Cabinet Minister with responsibility for health, higher education, cooperatives, disaster management, dairy development and protocols.

Controversy 
Dhan Singh Rawat has landed into controversy after he purportedly said in a viral video that the government was thinking of "using an app to control the intensity of rainfall". As an aftermath, a lot of statements came to light accusing Dhan Singh Rawat of forging his doctorate. The statement is believed to have been made at a recent media interaction which detailed steps taken by the government to tackle rain-related damage.

To which former chief minister and Congress veteran Harish Rawat took a jibe saying, “Uttarakhand chief minister Pushkar Dhami should propose his cabinet minister's name for Bharat Ratna.”

References

1972 births
Living people
People from Pauri Garhwal district
Uttarakhand MLAs 2022–2027
Bharatiya Janata Party politicians from Uttarakhand